Mill Lake is an alpine lake in Blaine County, Idaho, United States, located in the Smoky Mountains in Sawtooth National Recreation Area of Sawtooth National Forest. The lake is most easily accessed via trail 136 from the end of forest road 179. The lake is located north of Norton Peak.

References

Lakes of Idaho
Lakes of Blaine County, Idaho
Glacial lakes of the United States
Glacial lakes of the Sawtooth National Forest